Pentameris is a genus of plants in the grass family, native primarily to Africa, with a few species in Yemen and on certain islands in the Indian Ocean.

A significant number of species are endemic to South Africa.

 Species

 formerly included
see Chaetobromus Danthonia Merxmuellera Pseudopentameris Tenaxia

References

External links 

 Grassbase - The World Online Grass Flora

Danthonioideae
Grasses of Africa
Grasses of South Africa
Poaceae genera